The 1993 Big Ten Conference baseball tournament was held at C. O. Brown Stadium in Battle Creek, Michigan, from May 15 through 19. The top four teams from the regular season participated in the double-elimination tournament, the thirteenth annual tournament sponsored by the Big Ten Conference to determine the league champion. The Gophers claimed their fifth tournament championship and earned the Big Ten Conference's automatic bid to the 1993 NCAA Division I baseball tournament. This was also the first time the tournament was held outside the home venue of a conference member.

Format and seeding 
The 1993 tournament was a 4-team double-elimination tournament, with seeds determined by conference regular season winning percentage only.

Tournament

All-Tournament Team 
The following players were named to the All-Tournament Team.

Most Outstanding Player 
Matt Beaumont was named Most Outstanding Player. Beaumont was a pitcher for Ohio State.

References 

Tournament
Big Ten baseball tournament
Big Ten Baseball Tournament
Big Ten baseball tournament